Uzbeks in Turkey - one of the ethnic groups of the country. Like the Turks, Uzbeks are Turkic-speaking and also profess Islam. The number of the Uzbek diaspora in Turkey is approximately 70,000 people, Uzbeks live in almost all regions and large cities of the country.

History  
The first Turks of Central Asia arrived in Asia Minor, that is, on the territory of present-day Turkey, a thousand years ago, in the middle of the 11th century, together with the migration of various Turkic tribes. There are nine villages in modern Turkey called Uzbek: in the Central region of the Çanakkale region, in the northwest of the country, near the Dardanelles Strait; in the Shabanoz district of the Çankırı region in the north; in the Kulp district of the Diyarbakir region in the southeast; in the Central District of Erzurum Province in the east; in the Urla district of the Izmir region in the west; in the Elbistan and Turkoglun districts of the Kahramanmarash region in the southeast; in the Pamukovinsky district of the Sakarya region in the northwest; in the Idil district of the Şırnak region in the southeast.
On the fourth kilometer of the Urla-Cesme highway, there is a small tekke settlement Samut Baba, which was built during the Seljuk period by one of the Turkic Alperens who arrived from Central Asia (Alperens are called nineteen thousand students of the famous thinker Ahmad Yasawi, whom he taught to live the Islamic canons. Yasawi sent Alperens to Anatolia to spread the Sufi teachings among the local population. The age of the tekke is about nine hundred years.

Gallery

See also  
Uzbeks
Uzbek Americans

References

External links  
 Southern Uzbeks in Turkey 

Central Asian diaspora in Turkey
Turkey